Villa de Cos is one of 58 municipalities of Zacatecas, Mexico. It is located in the center-east of the state, bordered by the municipalities of Mazapil, Francisco R. Murguia, Río Grande, Felipe Pescador, Fresnillo, Panuco and Guadalupe in Zacatecas as well as Santo Domingo and Villa de Ramos in the neighboring state of San Luis Potosí. It has an area of 6,405 km2 occupying 8.53% of state territory. The municipal seat is located in the town of the same name. According to figures from INEGI, in 2010 it had a population of 34.328 inhabitants. Its main economic activity is picking chile and feedlot.

As of March 11, 2021, 335 cases and 45 deaths related to the COVID-19 pandemic in Mexico were reported in the municipality.

Four police officers were killed when their patrol car was blown up by a criminal gang near Chupaderos on March 12, 2021. Seven people were later arrested and two killed in a confrontation with police in Tepozán.

References

Municipalities of Zacatecas